John "Jack" Hoobin (23 June 1927 – 10 June 2000) was an Australian cyclist who competed in the individual road race at the 1948 Summer Olympics. He also won in the amateur division at the 1950 UCI Road World Championship.

References

1927 births
2000 deaths
Australian male cyclists
Cyclists at the 1948 Summer Olympics
Olympic cyclists of Australia
Cyclists from Greater London
Australian track cyclists
Sport Australia Hall of Fame inductees
20th-century Australian people